The Syracuse Orange women represented Syracuse University in CHA women's ice hockey during the 2016-17 NCAA Division I women's ice hockey season.  They came in second in their conference and reached the conference championship game before falling to Robert Morris.

Offseason
July 21: Allie Munroe was invited to The Team Canada Development Camp in Calgary.

Recruiting

Standings

Roster

2016–17 Orange

Schedule

|-
!colspan=12 style="background:#0a2351; "| Regular Season

|-
!colspan=12 style="background:#0a2351; "| CHA Tournament

Awards and honors
Abbey Miller, CHA Goaltender of the Month, January, 2017
Stephanie Grossi, CHA Player of the Month, January, 2017
Abbey Miller, CHA Goaltender of the Month, February, 2017
Allie Munroe, CHA Defenseman of the Year
Abbey Miller, Goaltending Trophy (Best Goals Against Average)
Allie Munroe, Defender, First Team All-Conference
Stephanie Grossi, Forward, First Team All-Conference
Abbey Miller, Goaltender, Second Team All-Conference
Lindsay Eastwood, Defender, CHA All-Rookie Team
Savannah Rennie, Forward, CHA All-Rookie Team

References

Syracuse
Syracuse Orange women's ice hockey seasons
Syracuse Orange
Syracuse Orange